The 1943 Washington Redskins were the defending NFL champions and finished the regular season at 6–3–1. They lost their last three games, including the final two to the New York Giants, and the two teams finished with identical records.  Although the Giants had won both games between the teams, the rules of the time called for a tiebreaker playoff game to determine the Eastern division champion.  The extra game was held at the Polo Grounds in New York City, which the underdog Redskins won, 28–0.

In a rematch of the previous year's title game, the Redskins met the Chicago Bears in the NFL championship game. This game was played in Chicago at Wrigley Field on December 26, and was won by the host Bears, 41–21.

Schedule

Playoffs

Standings

Video
You Tube – Detroit Lions at Washington Redskins – (color, no audio) – November 14, 1943

References

Washington
Washington Redskins seasons
Washington